The canton of Saint-Philbert-de-Grand-Lieu is an administrative division of the Loire-Atlantique department, western France. Its borders were modified at the French canton reorganisation which came into effect in March 2015. Its seat is in Saint-Philbert-de-Grand-Lieu.

It consists of the following communes:
 
Le Bignon
La Chevrolière
Corcoué-sur-Logne
Geneston
Legé
La Limouzinière
Montbert
Pont-Saint-Martin
Saint-Colomban
Saint-Lumine-de-Coutais
Saint-Philbert-de-Grand-Lieu
Touvois

References

Cantons of Loire-Atlantique